Glenn Truesdell (June 1, 1909 – 1992) was an American businessman and politician.

Born in Edgeley, North Dakota, Truesdell was in the farming and gas business. He was also an auctioneer and assessor and lived in Pine City, Minnesota. He served in the Minnesota House of Representatives 1959–1960.

Notes

1909 births
People from LaMoure County, North Dakota
People from Pine City, Minnesota
Businesspeople from Minnesota
Members of the Minnesota House of Representatives
1992 deaths
20th-century American businesspeople
20th-century American politicians